This article contains lists of the United States men's national water polo team rosters at the Summer Olympics. The lists are updated as of March 30, 2020.

Abbreviations

Rosters by tournament
Men's water polo tournaments have been staged at the Olympic Games since 1900. The United States has participated in 22 of 27 tournaments.

1900 Summer Olympics
 Maximum number of entries and participants: 1 team of 7 players and 4 reserves per club
 Number of participating nations: 4
 Host city:  Paris
 Final Ranking: Did not participate

1904 Summer Olympics
 Maximum number of entries and participants: 1 team of 7 players per club (Demonstration event)
 Number of participating nations: 1 (Demonstration event)
 Host city:  St. Louis
 New York Athletic Club
 Final Ranking: 1st place ( Gold medal) (Demonstration event)
 Head coach:  Gus Sundstrom

 Chicago Athletic Association
 Final Ranking: 2nd place ( Silver medal) (Demonstration event)
 Head coach:  Alex Meffert

 Missouri Athletic Club
 Final Ranking: 3rd place ( Bronze medal) (Demonstration event)
 Head coach: N/A

1908 Summer Olympics
 Maximum number of entries and participants: 1 team of 7 players per club
 Number of participating nations: 4
 Host city:  London
 Final Ranking: Did not participate

1912 Summer Olympics
 Maximum number of entries and participants: 1 team of 7 players and 4 reserves per club
 Number of participating nations: 6
 Host city:  Stockholm
 Final Ranking: Did not participate

1920 Summer Olympics
 Maximum number of entries and participants: 1 team of 7 players and 4 reserves per nation
 Number of participating nations: 12
 Host city:  Antwerp
 Final Ranking: 4th place
 Head coach:  Otto Wahle

 Note:
 Duke Kahanamoku and Clyde Swendsen might be reserves or alternates. They did not compete in this tournament.

1924 Summer Olympics
 Maximum number of entries and participants: 1 team of 7 players and 4 reserves per nation
 Number of participating nations: 13
 Host city:  Paris
 Final Ranking: 3rd place ( Bronze medal)
 Head coach:  Harry Hebner (did not go) /  Otto Wahle

 Note:
 The 11 players above were all listed in page 488, 490, 494 and 496 of the Official Report of the 1924 Olympic Games (page 486, 488, 492 and 494 of the PDF document).
 Telford Cann and Harold Kruger might be reserves or alternates. They did not compete in this tournament. The official report of the International Olympic Committee did not count them as competitors or medalists.

1928 Summer Olympics
 Maximum number of entries and participants: 1 team of 7 players and 4 reserves per nation
 Number of participating nations: 14
 Host city:  Amsterdam
 Final Ranking: 7th place
 Head coach:  Perry McGillivray

 Note:
 The 11 players above were all listed in page 765, 811 and 815 of the Official Report of the 1928 Olympic Games (page 757, 803 and 807 of the PDF document).
 Ogden Driggs, Reginald Harrison, Fred Lauer and David Young might be reserves or alternates. They did not compete in this tournament. The official report of the International Olympic Committee did not count them as competitors.

1932 Summer Olympics
 Maximum number of entries and participants: 1 team of 7 players and 4 reserves per nation
 Number of participating nations: 5
 Host city:  Los Angeles
 Final Ranking: 3rd place ( Bronze medal)
 Head coach:  Frank Rivas

 Note:
 The 7 players above were all listed in page 607, 629, 630, 631, 632 and 633 of the Official Report of the 1932 Olympic Games (page 623, 646, 647, 648, 649 and 650 of the PDF document).
 David Barclay, Frank Graham, Duke Kahanamoku, Fred Lauer, William O'Connor, Ray Ruddy, Theodore von Hemert and Ted Wiget might be reserves or alternates. They did not compete in this tournament. The official report of the International Olympic Committee did not count them as competitors or medalists.

1936 Summer Olympics
 Maximum number of entries and participants: 1 team of 7 players and 4 reserves per nation
 Number of participating nations: 16
 Host city:  Berlin
 Final Ranking: 9th place
 Head coach:  Clyde Swendsen

 Note:
 The 9 players above were all listed in page 984 of the Official Report of the 1936 Olympic Games (page 345 of the PDF document).
 William Kelly might be a reserve or alternate. He did not compete in this tournament. The official report of the International Olympic Committee did not count him as a competitor.

1948 Summer Olympics
 Maximum number of entries and participants: 1 team of 7 players and 4 reserves per nation
 Number of participating nations: 18
 Host city:  London
 Final Ranking: 11th place
 Head coach:  Austin Clapp

 Note:
 The 8 players above were all listed in page 470 and 472 of the Official Report of the 1948 Olympic Games (page 642 and 644 of the PDF document).
 John Miller, Donald Tierney and Frank Walton might be reserves or alternates. They did not compete in this tournament. The official report of the International Olympic Committee did not count them as competitors.

1952 Summer Olympics
 Maximum number of entries and participants: 1 team of 7 players and 4 reserves per nation
 Number of participating nations: 21
 Host city:  Helsinki
 Final Ranking: 4th place
 Head coach:  Urho Saari

 Note:
 The 10 players above were all listed in page 599, 600, 603, 604 and 605 of the Official Report of the 1952 Olympic Games (page 602, 603, 606, 607 and 608 of the PDF document).
 Robert Koehler might be a reserve or alternate. He did not compete in this tournament. The official report of the International Olympic Committee did not count him as a competitor.

1956 Summer Olympics
 Maximum number of entries and participants: 1 team of 7 players and 4 reserves per nation
 Number of participating nations: 10
 Host city:  Melbourne
 Final Ranking: 5th place
 Head coach:  Neil Kohlhase

 Note:
 The 10 players above were all listed in page 623 and 624 of the Official Report of the 1956 Olympic Games (page 625 and 626 of the PDF document).
 Donald Good might be a reserve or alternate. He did not compete in this tournament. The official report of the International Olympic Committee did not count him as a competitor.

1960 Summer Olympics
 Maximum number of entries and participants: 1 team of 7 players and 4 reserves per nation
 Number of participating nations: 16
 Host city:  Rome
 Final Ranking: 7th place
 Head coach:  Neil Kohlhase
 Assistant coach:  Urho Saari

 Note:
 The 10 players above were all listed in page 615, 616, 619, 620 and 623 of the Official Report of the 1960 Olympic Games (page 624, 625, 628, 629 and 632 of the PDF document).
 Jim Kelsey might be a reserve or alternate. He did not compete in this tournament. The official report of the International Olympic Committee did not count him as a competitor.

1964 Summer Olympics
 Maximum number of entries and participants: 1 team of 7 players and 4 reserves per nation
 Number of participating nations: 13
 Host city:  Tokyo
 Final Ranking: 9th place
 Head coach:  Urho Saari

 Note:
 The 11 players above were all listed in page 676, 679 and 681 of the Official Report of the 1964 Olympic Games (page 685, 688 and 690 of the PDF document).

1968 Summer Olympics
 Maximum number of entries and participants: 1 team of 7 players and 4 reserves per nation
 Number of participating nations: 15
 Host city:  Mexico City
 Final Ranking: 5th place
 Head coach:  Art Lambert
 Assistant coaches:  Robert Horn (did not go),  Monte Nitzkowski

 Note:
 The 11 players above were all listed in page 813, 815, 816, 818, 821, 822, 824 and 826 of the Official Report of the 1968 Olympic Games (page 812, 814, 815, 817, 820, 821, 823 and 825 of the PDF document).

1972 Summer Olympics
 Maximum number of entries and participants: 1 team of 7 players and 4 reserves per nation
 Number of participating nations: 16
 Host city:  Munich
 Final Ranking: 3rd place ( Bronze medal)
 Head coach:  Monte Nitzkowski
 Assistant coach:

 Note:
 The 11 players above were all listed in page 353, 354, 355, 363, 364 and 365 of the Official Report of the 1972 Olympic Games (page 353, 354, 355, 363, 364 and 365 of the PDF document).

1976 Summer Olympics
 Maximum number of entries and participants: 1 team of 7 players and 4 reserves per nation
 Number of participating nations: 12
 Host city:  Montreal
 Final Ranking: Did not qualify

1980 Summer Olympics
 Maximum number of entries and participants: 1 team of 7 players and 4 reserves per nation
 Number of participating nations: 12
 Host city:  Moscow
 Final Ranking: Qualified but withdrew
 Head coach:  Monte Nitzkowski

 Note:
 The 11 players above were all listed on the webpage of the USA Water Polo.

1984 Summer Olympics
 Maximum number of entries and participants: 1 team of 7 players and 6 reserves per nation
 Number of participating nations: 12
 Host city:  Los Angeles
 Final Ranking: 2nd place ( Silver medal)
 Head coach:  Monte Nitzkowski
 Assistant coach:  Ken Lindgren

 Note:
 The 13 players above were all listed in page 577, 579, 580 and 582 of the Official Report of the 1984 Olympic Games (page 528, 530, 531 and 533 of the PDF document).

1988 Summer Olympics
 Maximum number of entries and participants: 1 team of 7 players and 6 reserves per nation
 Number of participating nations: 12
 Host city:  Seoul
 Final Ranking: 2nd place ( Silver medal)
 Head coach:  Bill Barnett
 Assistant coaches:  Dave Almquist,  Steve Heaston

 Note:
 The 13 players above were all listed in page 598, 599, 600, 602 of the Official Report of the 1988 Olympic Games (page 593, 594, 595, 597 of the PDF document).

1992 Summer Olympics
 Maximum number of entries and participants: 1 team of 7 players and 6 reserves per nation
 Number of participating nations: 12
 Host city:  Barcelona
 Final Ranking: 4th place
 Head coach:  Bill Barnett
 Assistant coaches:  Guy Baker,  John Tanner

 Note:
 The 13 players above were all listed in page 386, 387, 388, 389, 390, 399 and 400 of the Official Report of the 1992 Olympic Games (page 386, 387, 388, 389, 390, 399 and 400 of the PDF document).

1996 Summer Olympics
 Maximum number of entries and participants: 1 team of 7 players and 6 reserves per nation
 Number of participating nations: 12
 Host city:  Atlanta
 Final Ranking: 7th place
 Head coach:  Richard Corso
 Assistant coaches:  Ricardo Azevedo,  John Vargas

 Note:
 The 13 players above were all listed in page 47, 48, 49, 50, 51, 55, 56 and 57 of the Official Report of the 1996 Olympic Games (page 62, 63, 64, 65, 66, 70, 71 and 72 of the PDF document).

2000 Summer Olympics
 Maximum number of entries and participants: 1 team of 7 players and 6 reserves per nation
 Number of participating nations: 12
 Host city:  Sydney
 Final Ranking: 6th place
 Head coach:  John Vargas
 Assistant coaches:  Richard Corso,  John Tanner

 Note:
 The 13 players above were all listed in page 42, 47, 51, 53, 80, 82, 89 and 90 of the Official Results Book of the 2000 Olympic Games (PDF document).

2004 Summer Olympics
 Maximum number of entries and participants: 1 team of 7 players and 6 reserves per nation
 Number of participating nations: 12
 Host city:  Athens
 Final Ranking: 7th place
 Head coach:  Ratko Rudić
 Assistant coaches:  Ricardo Azevedo,  Dan Leyson

 Note:
 The 13 players above were all listed in page 95, 97, 105, 112, 118, 159, 167, 229, 230, 231 and 232 of the Official Results Book of the 2004 Olympic Games (PDF document).

2008 Summer Olympics
 Maximum number of entries and participants: 1 team of 7 players and 6 reserves per nation
 Number of participating nations: 12
 Host city:  Beijing
 Final Ranking: 2nd place ( Silver medal)
 Head coach:  Terry Schroeder
 Assistant coaches:  Ryan Brown,  Robert Lynn

 Note:
 The 13 players above were all listed in page 79, 116, 118, 126, 132, 138, 158, 168, 213, 214 and 215 of the Official Results Book of the 2008 Olympic Games (PDF document).

2012 Summer Olympics
 Maximum number of entries and participants: 1 team of 7 players and 6 reserves per nation
 Number of participating nations: 12
 Host city:  London
 Final Ranking: 8th place
 Head coach:  Terry Schroeder
 Assistant coaches:  Robert Lynn,  Marco Palazzo

 Note:
 The 13 players above were all listed on the webpage of the USA Water Polo and in page 26 and 27 of 2012 USA Water Polo Olympic Media Guide (PDF document).

2016 Summer Olympics
 Maximum number of entries and participants: 1 team of 7 players and 6 reserves per nation
 Number of participating nations: 12
 Host city:  Rio de Janeiro
 Final Ranking: 10th place
 Head coach:  Dejan Udovičić
 Assistant coaches:  Jack Kocur,  Alex Rodriguez

 Note:
 The 13 players above were all listed on the webpage of the USA Water Polo and in page 24 and 25 of 2016 USA Water Polo Media Guide (PDF document).

Statistics

Number of competitors and average age, height & weight

Historical progression – returning Olympians

Historical progression – average age, height and weight

See also
 United States men's Olympic water polo team results
 United States men's Olympic water polo team statistics
 United States men's Olympic water polo team statistics (appearances)
 United States men's Olympic water polo team statistics (matches played)
 United States men's Olympic water polo team statistics (scorers)
 United States men's Olympic water polo team statistics (goalkeepers)
 United States men's Olympic water polo team statistics (medalists)
 List of United States men's national water polo team rosters
 United States men's national water polo team

Notes

References

External links
 Official website

Men's Olympic rosters
Olympic men's rosters
United States Olympic men's rosters